EKT may refer to:

 Eskilstuna Airport, Sweden (by IATA code)
 EKT Gdynia, a Polish shanty-band
 Epsilon Kappa Theta, a sorority at Dartmouth College
 National Documentation Centre (Greece) (EKT)